Assoli Vitalyevna Slivets (born 22 June 1982), also known under the nickname Assoli "Oly" Slivets, is a Belarusian, and later Russian freestyle skier. She competed for Belarus until 2011, and then switched to Russia.

She has participated at two Olympic Games in the Aerial event. She came fifth at the 2006 Olympics  and reached the finals at the 2010 Olympics.

She won a bronze at the 2007 World Ski Championships in the Aerials event.

She made the podium at five of her first 53 World Cup events.

Her hometown club in Minsk was the Republican Centre for Physical Education and Sports. Later she moved to Sochi. Assoli Slivets is a sister of a freestyle skier Timofei Slivets.

References

1982 births
Living people
Belarusian female freestyle skiers
Russian female freestyle skiers
Freestyle skiers at the 2002 Winter Olympics
Freestyle skiers at the 2006 Winter Olympics
Freestyle skiers at the 2010 Winter Olympics
Freestyle skiers at the 2014 Winter Olympics
Olympic freestyle skiers of Belarus
Olympic freestyle skiers of Russia
Sportspeople from Minsk